KCUE (1250 AM, Bluff Country 1250) is a radio station broadcasting a classic country music format. Licensed to Red Wing, Minnesota, United States, the station is currently owned by the Q Media Group, LLC.

Programming
KCUE features a Classic Country Format.  It has hourly updates from Fox News Radio, programming from Linder Farm Network, local news, and weather.  KCUE is an affiliate of the Minnesota Vikings radio network.  It also has Red Wing High School sports, and some Red Wing Aces amateur baseball.

History 
The Station dates back to 1950 and was owned by Red Wing Broadcasting Company at its start. On July 16, 2004, the station was sold to Sorenson Broadcasting Corp.

References

External links

Country radio stations in the United States
Radio stations in Minnesota
Radio stations established in 2004
Red Wing, Minnesota